István Gazda (22 November 1927 - 2006) was a Hungarian philatelist who was added to the Roll of Distinguished Philatelists in 1993.

Gazda is the co-author and co-editor of the Hungarian Philatelic Encyclopedia, Director of the Hungarian Philatelic Association, and the Special Representative in Hungary of the Royal Philatelic Society London.

References

Signatories to the Roll of Distinguished Philatelists
Hungarian philatelists
1927 births
2006 deaths
Fellows of the Royal Philatelic Society London